Old Thom is a male North Atlantic killer whale (orca) known for being the only killer whale to regularly be sighted in the Gulf of Maine and the Bay of Fundy. Often referred to as a loner, the whale has never been seen with other orcas, but is often accompanied by Atlantic white-sided dolphins, who seem to feed alongside the orca. The orca has received considerable media attention for its visits to Cape Cod in 2016 and 2022.

Identifying features 

Old Thom is a large bull orca, and is estimated to be 25 to 30 feet long, with an estimated weight of 8 tons. The whale is identified by a distinct notch a third of the way down the posterior side of the dorsal fin.

Sighting history 

The first known sighting of Old Thom was in 2006, spotted by Canadian whale watching boats in the Bay of Fundy. The whale has since been seen nearly annually in the Bay of Fundy. In August 2010, the whale was observed in the Roseway Basin by the New England Aquarium, which was conducting North Atlantic right whale surveys. 
In July 2016, Old Thom was photographed by charter boat captain Bruce Peters 13 miles off the coast of Chatham, Massachusetts. In May 2022, the orca was again seen off the coast of Cape Cod by fishermen. In August 2022, Old Thom was observed by whale watch boats off of Eastport, Maine.

See also
 List of individual cetaceans
 North Atlantic and adjacent orca populations

References

Individual orcas